Pakhomov is a Russian surname. The female form is Pakhomova. The surname came from Pakhom, a Russian adaptation of the Coptic-Greek name Παχώμιος. Notable people with the surname include:

Alexei Pakhomov (1900–1973), Russian painter
Alexei Pakhomov (pilot) (1912–1968), Soviet fighter pilot and air force general
Anatoly Pakhomov (born 1960), Russian politician
Boris Pakhomov (1931–2005), Soviet pentathlete
Daniil Pakhomov (born 1998), Russian swimmer
Leonid Pakhomov (born 1943), Russian football manager
Lyudmila Pakhomova (1946–1986), Soviet ice dancer and the 1976 Olympic champion
Nikolay Pakhomov (1893−1938), Soviet government official
Yevgeni Pakhomov (1880–1965), Russian numismatist

Russian-language surnames